The term corrugated, describing a series of parallel ridges and furrows, may refer to the following:

Materials
Corrugated fiberboard, also called corrugated cardboard
Corrugated galvanised iron, a building material composed of sheets of cold-rolled hot-dip galvanised mild steel
Corrugated plastic, a wide range of extruded twinwall plastic-sheet products produced from high-impact polypropylene resin
Corrugated stainless steel tubing, tubing made of stainless steel with corrugation on the inside or outside

Animals
Corrugated darter, a species of fish endemic to the eastern United States
Corrugated pipefish, a marine fish of the family Syngnathidae
Corrugated frog, a species of frog in the family Dicroglossidae
Corrugated water frog, a species of frog in the family Nyctibatrachidae
Corrugated nutmeg,  a species of sea snail

Other uses
 Corrugaphone or whirly tube, an experimental musical instrument or toy
 Corrugated road, a form of damage prone to develop in the surface of unpaved roads, see washboarding 
U.S. Corrugated, an independent corrugated packaging producer headquartered in the United States

See also
Corrugator (disambiguation)